Eugene Richard Michael (June 2, 1938 – September 7, 2017), known as Stick, was an American professional baseball player, coach, scout, manager and team executive. He played in Major League Baseball as a shortstop from 1966 to 1975, most prominently as a member of the New York Yankees where he anchored the infield for seven seasons in the late 1960s and early ’70s. He also played for the Pittsburgh Pirates, Los Angeles Dodgers, and Detroit Tigers. He was a light hitter but also a quick and smooth defensive player.

After his playing career, Michael managed the Yankees and Chicago Cubs, and served as the Yankees' general manager. As a baseball executive, Michael is credited with rebuilding the Yankees team that became a dynasty in the late 1990s.

Early life and education
Michael was born on June 2, 1938 in Kent, Ohio. After graduating from Akron East High School in Akron, Ohio, he went to Kent State University where he played college baseball and college basketball for the Kent State Golden Flashes.

He spent one season (1966-67) playing professional basketball for the Columbus Comets of the North American Basketball League.

Playing career
After being signed by the Pittsburgh Pirates in 1959, Michael made his major league debut with the Pirates in 1966. As a player, Michael earned the nickname "Stick" due to his slender frame.

The following year, the Pirates traded Michael to the Los Angeles Dodgers with Bob Bailey for Maury Wills. He spent one season in Los Angeles, and was then purchased by the New York Yankees. He played for the Yankees from 1968 until 1974. The Yankees released Michael before the 1975 season, after which he signed with the Detroit Tigers. Michael then signed with the Boston Red Sox in 1976, though did not play in a single game with Boston, having been released in May without using him once. He retired with a .229 batting average, 15 home runs, and 226 runs batted in in 973 games played. Michael was a master of the hidden ball trick, having pulled it off five times in his career.

Post-playing career
Weeks after his release from Boston, Michael became a coach with the Yankees. Reggie Jackson credited Michael's scouting reports for helping him hit three home runs in Game 6 of the 1977 World Series. He served as manager of the Yankees Triple-A team in 1979, and as general manager of the Yankees in 1980. In 1981, Michael became the Yankees' manager. He had managed well in Triple-A, but veteran Yankees thought he was selected because he would be more likely to follow Yankee owner George Steinbrenner's orders than predecessor Dick Howser. At one point in the 1981 season, annoyed by Steinbrenner's constant interference, he challenged the Yankees owner to fire him. He was fired in September. He was hired again in 1982. However, he was fired in August after publicly criticizing Steinbrenner's interference. As a manager, he and his coaches would keep extensive data in notebooks, which they would study to help make decisions. Michael finished with a record of 92 wins and 76 losses over both stints as Yankees manager. Michael returned to the Yankees front office in 1983, and again served as a coach starting in 1984. He next managed the Chicago Cubs in 1986 and 1987. His managerial record with the Chicago Cubs was 114 wins and 124 losses.

In 1990, Michael was again hired, this time as general manager of the Yankees. At a time when Steinbrenner was suspended from baseball operations by Commissioner Fay Vincent, Michael took advantage of his newfound managerial flexibility by rebuilding the Yankees farm system, in developing young talent rather than trading it away, as they had done in the 1980s with little success. During Michael's tenure as general manager, the Yankees drafted or signed such notable players as Mariano Rivera, Andy Pettitte, Derek Jeter, Jorge Posada (collectively known as the Core Four), and others. Further, he traded for Paul O'Neill. Michael also demonstrated patience with Bernie Williams, whom Yankees owner George Steinbrenner had wanted to trade when he struggled early in his career.

This foundation paid off with Yankees championships in 1996, and from 1998–2000. However Michael was fired in 1995, before the Yankees dynasty began to win World Series, as a result of fallouts from the 1994 strike, which ended the Yankees chance of having the best record in the American League that year. It was the second time the Yankees fired Michael as a result of a strike; in 1981, he was fired as manager as a result of the team slumping after the 1981 strike.

From 1996 until 2002, Michael served as vice-president of major league scouting for the Yankees. In 2002, the Boston Red Sox tried to talk to Michael about their general manager position, but were not given permission by the Yankees. In 2003, Michael was promoted to vice-president and senior advisor. He held that position until his death.

During his time as Vice President, Michael was a regular attendee at the annual Old Timers Day festivities, where he served as the manager for both the Bombers and the Clippers teams in the exhibition game.

Managerial record

Personal life
During his tenure with the Yankees, Michael had been a resident of Norwood, New Jersey, and had four children. He married twice, his first marriage to Rae Reuter, ending in divorce.  

Michael died due to a heart attack on September 7, 2017, in Oldsmar, Florida, at age 79. Survivors at the time of his death include his second wife and four children. To honor Michael, the Yankees wore black armbands on their uniforms for the remainder of the 2017 season.

References

External links

1938 births
2017 deaths
Major League Baseball shortstops
Detroit Tigers players
Los Angeles Dodgers players
New York Yankees players
Pittsburgh Pirates players
Baseball players from Ohio
Grand Forks Chiefs players
Savannah Pirates players
Hobbs Pirates players
Kinston Eagles players
Columbus Jets players
Arizona Instructional League Dodgers players
Major League Baseball general managers
New York Yankees executives
New York Yankees managers
Chicago Cubs managers
Minor league baseball managers
New York Yankees coaches
Kent State Golden Flashes baseball players
Kent State Golden Flashes men's basketball players
Sportspeople from Kent, Ohio
People from Norwood, New Jersey
American men's basketball players